Asian Kung-Fu Generation Presents: Nano–Mugen Compilation 2006 is a compilation album released by Asian Kung-Fu Generation on July 5, 2006, to advertise their sixth annual Nano-Mugen Festival. The album features one song from each of the twelve groups — seven Japanese bands, three American bands, and two English bands — who performed.

Track listing

Chart positions

Album

References

External links
 CDJapan
 Nano-Mugen Fes. 2006 
 Nano-Mugen Fes. 2006 

Asian Kung-Fu Generation albums
2006 compilation albums